The Sixth Legislative Assembly of Delhi was constituted on 14th Feb 2015 after the 2015 Delhi Legislative Assembly elections were concluded earlier that month. Second Kejriwal ministry was the cabinet during the term of 6th Delhi Assembly.

History
Elections for 70 assembly seats in Delhi were concluded on 07th Feb 2015 and results were announced on 10th Feb 2015. The Aam Aadmi Party got a sweeping majority by winning 67 out of 70 seats. The Bharatiya Janata Party managed only 3 seats and all other parties, including the Indian National Congress could not manage to win any seats. AAP got 54.3% (4,879,127), BJP got 32.2% (2,891,510) and INC got 9.7% (867,027) of total votes polled. A total of 6 national parties, 10 state parties, 55 registered (unrecognised) parties and 1 independent candidate contested for the 70 assembly seats.

On 14th Feb 2015, Arvind Kejriwal was sworn in as the eighth Chief Minister of Delhi. Along with Kejriwal, six ministers were also sworn in the Second Kejriwal ministry.

In April, 2015, the speaker of the house recognized Vijender Gupta as the leader of opposition in the house.

As on 28 August 2017, AAP had 66 MLA, 4 belongs to BJP.

Jarnail Singh from Aam Aadmi Party resigned on 6 January 2017 to contest against sitting Punjab CM Parkash Singh Badal Shiromani Akali Dal party member Manjinder Singh Sirsa contested on the BJP ticket and won the Rajouri Garden assembly constituency in Feb 2017 By Poll Election.

AAP won the Bawana assembly constituency in Aug 2017 By Poll Election.

Office holders

Committees 
Chairman, (2015-2020) The Estimates Committee: Dinesh Mohaniya.

List of members

See also

 First Legislative Assembly of Delhi
 Second Legislative Assembly of Delhi
 Third Legislative Assembly of Delhi
 Fourth Legislative Assembly of Delhi
 Fifth Legislative Assembly of Delhi
 Seventh Legislative Assembly of Delhi
 Government of Delhi
 Legislative Assembly of Delhi
 1993, 1998, 2003, 2008, 2013 & 2015 Delhi Legislative Assembly elections.
Government of India
Politics of India

References

Delhi Legislative Assembly
2015 establishments in Delhi